Cedar Grove is a historic plantation house and farm located near Clarksville, Mecklenburg County, Virginia. The house was built in 1838, and is a  Greek Revival style brick dwelling. It consists of a large one-story block on a raised basement with a hipped roof capped with a smaller clerestory with a hipped
roof and modern flanking one-story brick wings the historic central block.  The front and rear facades feature entry porches with six Doric order columns.  Also on the property are the contributing ice house and smokehouse dating from 1838, and a number of other secondary
structures and agricultural buildings.

It was listed on the National Register of Historic Places in 2010.

References

Plantation houses in Virginia
Houses on the National Register of Historic Places in Virginia
Farms on the National Register of Historic Places in Virginia
Houses completed in 1838
Houses in Mecklenburg County, Virginia
National Register of Historic Places in Mecklenburg County, Virginia